Consuello Vera Rigotti (December 3, 1922 – February 18, 2012), professionally known as Linda Estrella, was a Filipina actress and singer, best known as one of the players of Sampaguita Pictures.

Biography
Consuello Vera Rigotti was born on December 3, 1922 to Jose Alcala Rigotti a Filipino of Italian descent from Albay and a Filipina mother Francisca Vera from Catanduanes. She grew up in Catanduanes and when they moved to Manila, she obtained a degree in Home Economics at Philippine Women's University.

Her uncle was Judge Jose Vera the founder of Sampaguita Pictures and filmmaker Marichu Vera-Perez is her niece. She was married to Dr. Adriano Acgoili Agana, with whom she adopted three children over the years, Tessie, Maria Lourdes, and a third child who is deceased.

Death
She died on February 18, 2012, in Hobart, Indiana, aged 89.

Filmography
Films
1969 - 9 Teeners
1956 - Pampanggenya
1955 - Bandilang Pula
1954 - ...At Sa Wakas
1954 - Kung Ako'y Maging Dalaga
1954 - Nagkita si Kerubin at si Tulisang Pugot
1954 - Milyonarya at Hampaslupa
1953 - Munting koronel
1952 - Teksas, Ang Manok na Nagsasalita
1952 - Kasaysayan ni Rudy Concepcion
1952 - Hihintayin kita
1952 - Hiram na mukha
1952 - Kerubin
1952 - Lihim ng Kumpisalan
1952 - Mayamang Balo
1951 - Anghel ng Pag-ibig
1951 - Walang Gulat
1951 - Batas ng daigdig
1951 - Kasaysayan ni Dr. Ramon Selga
1950 - 13 Hakbang
1950 - Makasalanang Banal
1950 - Mga Baguio Cadets
1950 - Campo O'Donnell
1949 - Apoy sa langit
1949 - Ilaw sa landas
1948 - Beast of the East
1948 - Hindi Kita Malimot
1948 - Krus ng Digma
1948 - Labi ng Bataan
1948 - Vende Cristo
1948 - Outrages of the Orient
1948 - Awit ng Bulag
1948 - Dalawang Dambana
1947 - Maria Kapra
1946 - Dalawang Daigdig
1946 - Voice of Freedom
1946 - Garrison 13
1941 - Princesita

Notes

External links

Filipino child actresses
1922 births
2012 deaths
Filipino people of Italian descent
Filipino film actresses
20th-century Filipino actresses
People from Catanduanes
Philippine Women's University alumni